The Britain–Australia Society was established in 1971 as a friendship society to promote historic links between the United Kingdom and Australia. It has headquarters in the Australia Centre within Australia House in London and branches throughout the United Kingdom.

History 

In 1971 Sir Robert Menzies and Sir Alec Douglas-Home, former Prime Ministers of Australia and the United Kingdom, re-founded the pre-existing Australia Club to form two apolitical and non-commercial societies, based in the United Kingdom and Australia.

Aims 
The aims of the Britain–Australia Society are to:
 strengthen existing friendship between the United Kingdom and Australia
 promote educational exchanges
 arrange social events for members
 provide a point of contact for Australians visiting the United Kingdom
 maintain links with Australia
 be a forum for personal and professional development of talented youth

Branches 
Branches are maintained in Cambridgeshire, Norfolk, Leicestershire, Lincoln, Portsmouth, and the West Country. Regional functions are held by these branches in addition to centrally-organised activities.

Events 
A primary activity is organising events including diplomatic dinners, seminars, and social gatherings. The West Country branch arranges an annual service of remembrance and lunch in Bath honouring the memory of Admiral Arthur Phillip.

Awards 
The Society grants an occasional Britain–Australia Society Award to recognise a person who has demonstrated a long-term contribution to relations between the United Kingdom and Australia. Past recipients have been Barry Humphries, Lord Hague, Kylie Minogue, David Attenborough, Lord Carrington and Samantha Cohen CVO.

Officers 
The Patron of the Society was The Prince Philip, Duke of Edinburgh KG KT OM GCVO GBE ONZ QSO AK GCL CC CMM.

The President is The Rt Hon. Lord Hague of Richmond (the founding President was Lord Carrington)

The Chairman is Damian Walsh

Vice Presidents:
 The High Commissioner for Australia  – Ex Officio
 Mr Peter Benson AM
 Sir Christopher Benson DL OAM
 The Earl of Buckinghamshire
 Sir Roger Carrick KCMG LVO FRGS
 Mr Rohan Courtney OBE
 The Lord Goodlad KCMG, PC
 Mr Brian Harris
 Mr Michael Whalley OAM
 Mr George Vestey DL

Honorary Vice-presidents:
 Dale Eaton FRGS
 The Baroness Liddell of Coatdyke PC
 Sylvia Countess of Limerick
 June Mendoza AO OBE
 Mr Barry Tuckwell AC OBE

Board of Management 

 Mr Damian Walsh – Chairman
 Ms Elizabeth Ames
 Mr Tim Dillon - Agent-General for Victoria (ex-officio observer)
 Ms Julie Heckscher – Deputy High Commissioner (ex-officio observer)
 Mr John Langoulant AO – Agent General for Western Australia (ex-officio observer)
 Mr Keith Newton – Chairman West Country Branch
 Mr Peter Sargent
 Ms Patricia Wadley
 Mr Edwin Wong

The Office Manager is Ms Marina Kinsman
The National Director is Louise Mulley

The Honorary Chaplain of the Society is George Bush, Rector of St Mary-le-Bow church.

Sponsors 
As a non-commercial society, administration and events are funded by membership subscriptions, management fees and corporate sponsors, including Australian Government agencies and businesses and organisations with an Australian interest in the United Kingdom or a British interest in Australia, such as the Commonwealth Bank of Australia.

Affiliates 
 Three Charitable Trusts are maintained by the society:
 The Britain–Australia Society Educational Trust provides sponsorship for young people of both countries, particularly for skills exchange.
 The Northcote Trust funds postgraduate scholarships to Australia.
 The Royal Flying Doctor Service – Friends in the UK
 The Cook Society was founded in 1969 on the initiative of Prime Ministers Sir Alec Douglas-Home and Sir Robert Menzies, with the aim of promoting British-Australian relations at a high level. It has counterparts in Australian States with which it is in constant touch. Membership of the Society in Britain is limited to 100, excluding Honorary members, and represents a wide range of national interests including senior business and professional people, politicians, civil servants and academics. Membership is by invitation only. The B-AS administers the Cook Society and shares some events.
 Australia-Britain Society members have reciprocal rights when in Britain, and vice versa.

References

External links 
 
 Australia-Britain Society
 The Menzies Foundation
 The Northcote Trust
 Britain-Australia Society Education Trust
 RFDS Friends in the UK

Clubs and societies in London
Clubs and societies in Australia
1971 establishments in the United Kingdom
Organizations established in 1971
Australia friendship associations
United Kingdom friendship associations
British-Australian culture